Wittenham is a place name in Oxfordshire, England, as in:

 Little Wittenham
 Little Wittenham Wood
 Long Wittenham
 Wittenham Clumps